Sherman Eugene Plunkett (April 17, 1933 – November 18, 1989) was an American football offensive tackle. Over a ten-year career he played in the National Football League (NFL), for the Baltimore Colts (1958 to 1960), and in the American Football League from 1961–1967, for the San Diego Chargers (1961–62) and the New York Jets (1963–67). He was an American Football League All-Star in 1964 and 1966 and a 1st Team All-Pro All-AFL in 1966.

Plunkett played college football at Maryland State College, now known as the University of Maryland Eastern Shore. He was said to be able to "run like a reindeer" at his then playing weight of around 235 lbs. While there, he was involved in a gesture of good sportsmanship, when its coach told its players to ease up on their overmatched and under-manned opponents, Hofstra University. The then Flying Dutchmen  had started the season with just twenty players before suffering injuries, and were in danger of having their program disbanded.  Leading 28-0 at the time, Maryland State never scored again.

According to Plunkett's teammate and future NFL star defensive back Johnny Sample, coach Vernon McCain, simply told his players, "This is the first time we are playing this school. We do not want to embarrass them." Spared by their opponent's gallantry, Hofstra went on to finish the season 7-3.

Plunkett was drafted by the Cleveland Browns in 1956, but had his NFL debut delayed two years by being drafted into the US Army a few months later.  He joined the Baltimore Colts in 1958 and was involved in what is dubbed as "The Greatest Game Ever Played" deciding that year's NFL championship. It resulted in both his and the Colts' first ever title win. They would repeat together in 1959.

Described as "a lineman with a giant paunch but dancing feet", Plunkett was known in his later playing years for his massive bulk, being listed as high as 315 lbs. in an era when the typical offensive tackle in the 1960s weighed in between 260–275 lbs.  Plunkett's coach on both the Colts and Jets, the legendary Weeb Ewbank, tried everything – including bonuses, incentives for Plunkett's wife, and fines – but nothing worked to keep the older Plunkett near his target weight of 300 lbs.  He retired just one year before the Jets' victory over the Colts in Super Bowl III in 1968.

According to star Jets' quarterback Joe Namath, it was Plunkett who coined his iconic nickname "Broadway Joe", following Namath's appearance on the cover of Sports Illustrated.

Plunkett died of cancer at the age of 56, at Sinai Hospital in Baltimore.

See also
 List of American Football League players

References

1933 births
1989 deaths
American football offensive tackles
Baltimore Colts players
Maryland Eastern Shore Hawks football players
New York Jets players
San Diego Chargers players
American Football League All-Star players
Sportspeople from Oklahoma City
Players of American football from Oklahoma
American Football League players